Yantimirovo (Yäntimer) is a rural locality (a village) in Kuntugushevsky Selsoviet, Baltachevsky District, Bashkortostan, Russia. The population was 205 as of 2010. There are 6 streets.

Geography 
Yantimirovo is located 19 km southeast of Starobaltachevo (the district's administrative centre) by road. Novourazayevo is the nearest rural locality.

References 

Rural localities in Baltachevsky District